Zamboni or The Zamboni may refer to:

 an ice resurfacer, commonly known as a "Zamboni" as a genericized trademark
 Zamboni Company, a maker of ice resurfacers, founded by ice resurfacer inventor Frank Zamboni
 The Zamboni (magazine), a student-run humor publication at Tufts University
 Zamboni (surname)
 "Zamboni" (song), a 1990 song by Gear Daddies
 The Zambonis, a Connecticut-based indie rock band
 nickname of Ken Reitz (1951–2021), American Major League Baseball player

See also
 Zamboni pile, an early electric battery
 Zamboni procedure, a procedure used in the treatment of chronic cerebrospinal venous insufficiency